Last Tango in Moscow is Angelic Upstarts's 6th album, released in 1984.

Track listing

Side A		
 "One More Day" (Thomas Mensforth, Ronnie Rocker) - 3:36
 "Machine Gun Kelly" (Mensforth, Max Splodge) - 2:36
 "Progress" (Mensforth, Brian Hayes) - 4:16
 "Blackleg Miner" (Traditional; arranged by Thomas Mensforth) - 1:20
 "Who's Got the Money" (Mensforth) - 2:59
 "Last Tango in Moscow" (Mensforth, Rocker) - 3:13
Side B	
 "I Think It Should Be Free" (Mensforth) - 3:29
 "Never Return" (Mensforth) - 2:37
 "Rude Boy" (Mensforth, Splodge, Mick English) - 3:02
 "No News" (Mensforth) - 2:58
 "Jarrow Woman" (Mensforth, Hayes) - 3:17
 "Nowhere to Run" (Holland-Dozier-Holland) - 3:32

Personnel
Angelic Upstarts
Thomas "Mensi" Mensforth - vocals
Martin "Max Splodge" Everest - guitar, vocals, drums
Rick "Ronnie Rocker" Newson - guitar, vocals
Brian Hayes - bass guitar, vocals
Chalfont Jaconelli - drums
Technical
Colin Peter - engineer

References

1984 albums
Angelic Upstarts albums